Carlos Rodrigues (born 18 February 1908, date of death unknown) was a Portuguese footballer who played as midfielder.

International career 
Rodrigues gained 3 caps for Portugal and made his debut 1 December 1929 in Milan against Italy, in a 1–6 defeat.

External links 
 
 
 

1908 births
Portuguese footballers
Association football midfielders
Primeira Liga players
C.F. Os Belenenses players
Portugal international footballers
Year of death missing